Jean Cayrol (6 June 1911 – 10 February 2005) was a French poet, publisher, and member of the Académie Goncourt born in Bordeaux. He is perhaps best known for writing the narration in Alain Resnais's 1955 documentary film, Night and Fog. He was a major contributor to the subversive, philosophical French publication Tel Quel.

In 1941, during the Nazi occupation of France, Cayrol joined the French Resistance, but he was subsequently betrayed, arrested, and sent to the Gusen concentration camp in 1943. He was one of the youngest French inmates at that camp, and consequently was made to do some of the hardest work along with the construction of roads and railways. When Cayrol wanted to die by refusing any further food, his life was saved by Dr. Johann Gruber, the "Saint of Gusen."  Gruber gave Cayrol some "Gruber soup" in the washroom of barrack No. 20, and intervened for Cayrol to get him transferred to an easier job. Cayrol thereafter worked at the final-inspection of Steyr-Daimler-Puch at KL Gusen I (the "Georgenmuehle" command), where he was able to write literature during breaks.

Between February 1944 and April 1945, Cayrol created a large volume of poetry at Gusen I. One of his poems from this era is the text for "Chant d' Espoir", which was set to music by a fellow Gusen I inmate, Remy Gillis, in 1944. Alerte aux ombres 1944–1945, a collection of Cayrol's Gusen texts, was published in 1997.

The figure of Lazarus appears many times in Cayrol's work. Having escaped death himself, Cayrol was fascinated and inspired by the story of Lazarus who died, who Jesus returned to life after being dead.

Cayrol founded and edited for ten years (1956–66) the review Ecrire, published by Éditions du Seuil, who had recruited him as an editorial adviser in 1949.

He retired to Bordeaux, where he died at the age of 93.

References

1911 births
2005 deaths
French Resistance members
Mauthausen concentration camp survivors
Prix Renaudot winners
Writers from Bordeaux
French male poets
20th-century French poets
20th-century French male writers
20th-century French short story writers
Christian novelists